This is a list of presidents and chancellors of the University of Wisconsin–Madison:

 * In 1963, Harrington reorganized the University of Wisconsin by creating one central administration, and separate administrations for each of the individual campuses (Madison, Milwaukee, and University Centers). Harrington remained the president of the central administration, while Robert Clodius became the acting provost of the Madison campus. Later, in 1970, Clodius became the acting president of the central administration until John Weaver took over in 1971.
 ** In 1971, the University of Wisconsin System was created by merging all four campuses (Madison, Milwaukee, Green Bay, and Parkside) and the Wisconsin State Universities. John Weaver became the first president of the UW system.

 ***First appointed as Provost, then changed to Chancellor in 1965.

References
 Chancellors and Presidents of the University of Wisconsin–Madison

University of Wisconsin–Madison
University Of Wisconsin Madison Presidents

Wisconsin-Madison